The Belém Brazil Temple is an announced temple of the Church of Jesus Christ of Latter-day Saints (LDS Church) to be constructed in Belém, Brazil.

The intent to construct the temple was announced by church president Thomas S. Monson on April 3, 2016, during the Sunday morning session of the church's general conference.  The Quito Ecuador and Harare Zimbabwe temples, along with a second temple in Lima, Peru, were announced at the same time. The church later announced the second temple in Peru would be named the Lima Peru Los Olivos Temple.

As of April 2016, the church reported there are more than 1.3 million church members in Brazil. The church's ninth to be built in Brazil, the temple's groundbreaking was held on August 17, 2019.

See also

 Comparison of temples of The Church of Jesus Christ of Latter-day Saints
 List of temples of The Church of Jesus Christ of Latter-day Saints
 List of temples of The Church of Jesus Christ of Latter-day Saints by geographic region
 Temple architecture (Latter-day Saints)
 The Church of Jesus Christ of Latter-day Saints in Brazil
 Religion in Brazil

References

External links
Belém Brazil Temple Official Site
Belém Brazil Temple at ChurchofJesusChristTemples.org

Proposed religious buildings and structures of the Church of Jesus Christ of Latter-day Saints
21st-century Latter Day Saint temples
Belém
Temples (LDS Church) in Brazil
Proposed buildings and structures in Brazil